The Old Manor is a Grade II listed building, which  stands in Pages Lane/Page's Place in  the Norfolk village of Saham Toney. The building was owned by Edward Goffe of Threxton, who died in 1612, and who is buried at Saham Toney. He left the building to his son. Edward Goffe founded the local school, where a plaque was erected in his name. There are almshouses,  founded by Edward Goffe. The beautiful stained glass window was made in Norwich Cathedral and originally came from St Marys church in  Great Cressingham.

Restoration of the Old Manor was featured on an episode (Series 2 - Episode 4) of the BBC Two series Restoration Home

References

External links 
 Page's Place, Saham Toney, Norfolk
 Restoration Home S02E04 Old Manor Restoration Home S02E04 Old Manor
 Page's-Place - Norfolk Heritage Explorer

Grade II listed houses in Norfolk
Grade II listed buildings in Norfolk
Norfolk